Luis Ranque Franque was Cabinda Nationalist Leader who served as the President of Cabinda and first president and founder of Front for the Liberation of the Enclave of Cabinda.

References 

Cabindan independence activists
People from Cabinda Province
Heads of state of former unrecognized countries